The Man in the Suit may refer to:

 "The Man in the Black Suit", a 1994 short story by Stephen King
 The Man in the Brown Suit, a 1924 novel by Agatha Christie
 The Man in the Funny Suit, a 1960 television drama
 The Man in the Gray Flannel Suit (novel), a 1955 novel by Sloan Wilson
 The Man in the Gray Flannel Suit, a 1956 film based on the novel
 The Man in the Gray Flannel Suit II, the 1984 sequel to the Wilson novel
 The Man in the White Suit, a 1951 movie starring Alec Guinness
 The Man in the White Suit (play), a 2019 play by Sean Foley based on the film
 John Reese (Person of Interest)), a character from the television series Person of Interest
 "The Man in the Gray Suit", a term used by fishers and surfers to refer to sharks